Thema may refer to:
 Lancia Thema, an executive car produced by Italian automaker Lancia 
 Theme (Byzantine district) or Thema, a Byzantine military-civilian province
 Thema (rapper), Italian rapper
 Thema (Omaggio a Joyce), an electroacoustic composition by Luciano Berio
 Thema, a composition for bass saxophone & computer-generated tape by Horacio Vaggione
 Thema International Fund, an Irish investment fund
 Thema, a subsidiary of Canal+ Group
 Themma, a genus of moths in the nominate subfamily Oecophorinae in the concealer moth family

See also
 Theme (disambiguation)